David Sadler (born 5 February 1946 in Yalding, Kent, England) is an English former footballer. He was a skilful central defender who could also play usefully in midfield or even as a forward. He is currently secretary of the Manchester United Former Players' Association.

Sadler started his career with Maidstone United, but signed a professional contract with Manchester United in 1963, helping the club win the 1965 and 1967 First Division Football League championships as well as the 1968 European Cup. He left United in 1974 after scoring 27 goals for the club to join Preston North End, who were being managed by Sadler's former teammate Bobby Charlton.

He made 121 appearances (including one as substitute) for the Deepdale club and scored four goals before retiring due to injury in 1977, by which time Charlton had resigned as manager.

Sadler was capped four times for England.

Post-football career
Sadler became a manager for a building society in Hale, Greater Manchester. He also became involved with Charlton in corporate hospitality.

Career statistics

Club statistics

International statistics

References

1946 births
Living people
Footballers from Kent
English footballers
Association football defenders
Association football midfielders
Association football forwards
England international footballers
England under-23 international footballers
Maidstone United F.C. (1897) players
Manchester United F.C. players
Miami Toros players
Preston North End F.C. players
North American Soccer League (1968–1984) players
English Football League players
English Football League representative players
English expatriate footballers
Expatriate soccer players in the United States
Association football utility players
English expatriate sportspeople in the United States
UEFA Champions League winning players